Leupoldsgrün is a municipality in Upper Franconia. It can be found in the district of Hof, which is part of Bavaria, Germany.

In 2014 the 26-year-old Annika Popp (CSU) was elected mayor of the town, thus becoming the youngest mayor in Bavaria. She was re-elected in 2020.

References

Hof (district)